Ramesh Lal (born 5 July 1968) is a Pakistani politician who has been a member of the National Assembly of Pakistan, since August 2018. Previously he was a member of the National Assembly from 2002 to May 2018. Lal is the only member of Parliament from minorities who has been elected for the fourth time consecutively.

Early life
Lal was born on 5 July 1968.

Political career
He was elected to the National Assembly of Pakistan as a candidate of Pakistan Peoples Party (PPP) on a seat reserved for minorities in the 2002 Pakistani general election.

He was re-elected to the National Assembly as a candidate of PPP on a seat reserved for minorities in the 2008 Pakistani general elections. From 2008 to 2013, he was Parliamentary Secretary for Tourism, Minorities and Postal Services respectively.

He was re-elected to the National Assembly as a candidate of PPP on a seat reserved for minorities in the 2013 Pakistani general election.

He was elected to the National Assembly as a candidate of PPP on a reserved seat for minorities in 2018 Pakistani general election.

References

Sindhi people
Pakistani Hindus
Pakistan People's Party MNAs
Living people
Pakistani MNAs 2008–2013
Pakistani MNAs 2013–2018
1968 births
Pakistani MNAs 2018–2023